Lewis Allen Browne (January 18, 1876 – May 24, 1937) was an American screenwriter of the silent era.

Selected filmography
 The Dangerous Paradise (1920)
 The Road of Ambition (1920)
 Marooned Hearts (1920)
 A Man of Stone (1921)
 The Way of a Maid (1921)
 Clay Dollars (1921)
 Poor, Dear Margaret Kirby (1921)
 The Highest Law (1921)
 Handcuffs or Kisses (1921)
 Society Snobs (1921)
 The Snitching Hour (1922)
 Reported Missing (1922)
 The Referee (1922)
 John Smith (1922)
 The Prophet's Paradise (1922)
 Why Announce Your Marriage? (1922)
 Shadows of the Sea (1922)
 The Man from M.A.R.S. (1922)
 The Love Bandit (1924)
 The Law and the Lady (1924)
 Roulette (1924)
 False Pride (1925)
 The Wrongdoers (1925)
 Broken Homes (1926)
 Wives at Auction (1926)
 The Virgin Wife (1926)
 Casey of the Coast Guard (1926)
 The Truth About Men (1926)
 Naughty but Nice (1927)

References

Bibliography
 John T. Soister, Henry Nicolella & Steve Joyce. American Silent Horror, Science Fiction and Fantasy Feature Films, 1913-1929. McFarland, 2014.

External links

1876 births
1937 deaths
American screenwriters
People from Sandwich, New Hampshire
20th-century American screenwriters